The Volkswagen Type 4 is a compact / midsize family car, manufactured and marketed by Volkswagen of Germany as a Dsegment car from 1968 to 1974 in two-door and four-door sedan as well as two-door station wagon body styles. The Type 4 evolved through two generations, the 411 (1968–72) and 412 series (1972–74).

Designed under the direction of Heinrich Nordhoff and introduced at the Paris Motor Show in October 1968, the 411 was Volkswagen's largest passenger vehicle with the company's largest engine – with styling credited to Carrozzeria Pininfarina, who at the time had an advisory contract with Volkswagen. The cars retained VW's trademark air-cooled, rear placement, rear-wheel drive, boxer engine with a front/rear weight distribution of 45/55% and a forward cargo storage  — while also introducing design and engineering departures for the company – including a completely flat passenger area floor and suspension using control arms and MacPherson struts.  Volkswagen had prototyped a notchback sedan and convertible versions of the 411, without introducing them to production.

Over its six-year production run, Volkswagen manufactured 367,728 Type 4 models, compared with 210,082 of the subsequent Volkswagen K70 with its four-year model life. In the United States, VW sold 119,627 Type 4s from 1971 to July 1974 and in Germany 119,094 cars were sold. South Africa was the third biggest market for the Type 4 with 34,452 sales and the United Kingdom was fourth at 13,367.

Volkswagen's last air-cooled sedans and wagons, (aside from the Brasília which carried on until 1982) the Type 4 models were succeeded by the first generation Passat, marketed as the Dasher in the USA.

Features
As Volkswagen's first 4-door saloon, the Type 4 also introduced unibody construction, coil springs, trailing wishbone rear suspension, hydraulic clutch manual transmission – as well as MacPherson strut front suspension: the 411's front suspension layout was subsequently adopted for the VW Type 1 1302/1303 ("Super Beetle").

When the Type 4 was discontinued in 1974, its engine carried on as the power plant for the larger-engined Volkswagen Type 2s, produced from 1972 to 1979, and for the later Volkswagen Type 2 (T3) bus from 1980 until 1983.

411
This fuel-injected engine was shared with the mid-engined Porsche 914, also launched in 1969. European 411 nomenclature highlighted the fuel injection with the suffix 'E' (for Einspritzung). Revisions in 1969 also included replacement of the single oval headlights with twin round headlights.

The Type 4's battery was located under the left hand front seat. All models featured ventless driver and front passenger windows, notched on their leading edge to provide draught-free ventilation, no cost metallic paint, radial ply tires, full carpeting, clock, electric rear window demister, flow-through ventilation, undercoating, and a thermostatically controlled auxiliary heating system, specifically, a gasoline-operated heater model BA4 by Eberspächer, fired by a spark plug, accessible from a hidden rear window deck plate.

The 411 was also assembled in South Africa beginning in 1969, in two- or four-door configurations. The four-door only came as a DeLuxe and was available with an optional automatic transmission, while the two-door was available either as a Standard or a DeLuxe.

In 1968, Karmann exhibited a prototype for a 411-based cabriolet, but this was not put into production.

412
The 412 replaced the 411 in August 1972 in Germany, having been restyled by designer Brooks Stevens. Halogen lights were fitted, the headlight surround was reshaped and the nose panels were redesigned. In August 1973 (for the 1974 model year), the engine capacity was raised to 1795 cc and fuel management reverted to a twin carburettor system; the 412LE was renamed 412LS. This was to be the last model year for the 412, with production ending in June 1974.

The visual design of the Volkswagen 412 Variant was retained when the Brazilian Type 3 models TL, Variant, Variant II, and later Brazilian Variant-based Volkswagen Brasilia were produced in Brazil, primarily for the Latin American markets.

In February 1974 on the German market, the four-door 412L was priced at DM 10,995 (DM 11,145 for the 412 LS).

The 412 was also built in South Africa from 1972 to 1974. The specification varied from European models with the omission of the Petrol heater, no rear window de-fogger as standard and with different paint options and interior trim. A total of 34,452 Type 4's (411 and 412) were produced in South Africa between 1969 and 1974.

Data

Sources and further reading

Type 4
Cars powered by boxer engines
Cars introduced in 1968
1970s cars
Rear-wheel-drive vehicles
Rear-engined vehicles
Sedans
Station wagons